Eric Shirley (born 3 April 1929) ran the 3,000 metres steeplechase final at the 1956 Summer Olympics in Melbourne, Australia for Great Britain with team mates Chris Brasher and John Disley, coming in 8th with a time of 8.57. He also competed in the 1960 Olympics in Rome Italy. He was a member of Finchley Harriers (founded 1877). In 1966, this club was amalgamated into Hillingdon Athletic Club.

References

1929 births
Living people
British male middle-distance runners
British male steeplechase runners
Athletes (track and field) at the 1956 Summer Olympics
Athletes (track and field) at the 1960 Summer Olympics
Olympic athletes of Great Britain